The palm crow (Corvus palmarum) is a relatively small corvid that occurs on the Caribbean island of Hispaniola (Haiti and the Dominican Republic) and Cuba, where it was formerly very frequent, but is now reduced in population.

Taxonomy
The Cuban subspecies is slightly smaller, and is usually separated as a subspecies (Corvus palmarum minutus); the Hispaniolan subspecies' trinomial is Corvus palmarum palmarum (the nominate subspecies). Both subspecies are usually now given the respective common names of Hispaniolan palm crow and Cuban palm crow to distinguish them. Despite being sympatric with the white-necked crow (Corvus leucognaphalus) on Hispaniola, it appears to be more closely related to the fish crow (C. ossifragus) of the East Coast of the United States, as well as two smaller species, the Tamaulipas crow (C. imparatus) and Sinaloan crow (C. sinaloae) of Mexico, than the white-necked crow, which is more related to the Cuban crow (Corvus nasicus) and the Jamaican crow (Corvus jamaicensis), the other two Caribbean corvids.

Habitat
The local name for the palm crow is cao in the Dominican Republic (where it is locally common, mainly in mountain pine forests and also around the area of Lake Enriquillo), which is onomatopoeic of the simple and repetitive call of this bird.

References

Birds described in 1835
Taxa named by Duke Paul Wilhelm of Württemberg
Birds of the Dominican Republic
Birds of Haiti
Birds of Cuba
Birds of Hispaniola
Corvus
Endemic birds of the Caribbean